Maxime Cressy was the defending champion but chose not to defend his title.

Vasek Pospisil won the title after defeating Michael Mmoh 7–6(7–5), 4–6, 6–4 in the final.

Seeds

Draw

Finals

Top half

Bottom half

References

External links
Main draw
Qualifying draw

Challenger Banque Nationale de Drummondville - 1
2022 Singles